Wilderness Road was a rock band founded in 1968 by musicians Warren Leming, Nate Herman, and relatives Andy and Tom Haban. The group, which performed an elaborate stage show, drew on American folklore, and was active in the Anti-War, and Peace Movements of the late Sixties and early Seventies central to Chicago's counterculture movement of the period.

Wilderness Road released two albums, Wilderness Road and Sold for the Prevention of Disease Only, and the group was originally formed to raise money for the Chicago Seven. The band also held staged events in the early 1970s such as the "Passover-Easter Spectacular" and "The Last Brunch", and also made commercials for places like "Spinoza's Torah Center".

Members
Warren Leming
Nate Herman
Andy Haban
Tom Haban

Past sidemen 
Lou  Henslee, Doug Kassel, Louis Ross, Bob Hoban (now with Rodney Carrington), Stuart Klawans (the Nation's film critic), Rawl Hardman, and Ric Mann all performed with the Road:

Discography
Wilderness Road (1972, Columbia Records)
Sold for the Prevention of Disease Only (1973, Warner Reprise - also known as For Prevention Only)

Press/Literature 
Critiques of the band's performance and history are to be found in Rolling Stone (Paul Nelson), Chicago Tribune (Lynn Van Matre, Bruce Vilanch, Dick Cheverton), Chicago Daily News (Jack Haffercamp), Playboy Magazine (David Standish), Creem (Dave Marsh), Chicago Seed (Eliot Wald, Abe Peck), Music Magazine, Variety, Billboard, East Village Other (Robert Rudnick), and the many "underground" papers of the period. Band member Warren Leming published a comic book "Snuk Comics", which featured the work of Leming and fellow band member Nate Herman,  illustrated by underground comic legend Skip Williamson. The comic has since become a widely sought after collectors item. Leming also wrote a series of essays,songs, and a play Cold Chicago, which has been published by Charles H.Kerr, the oldest surviving radical press in the United States.

References

External links
 Unofficial website maintained by fans
 Wilderness Road interview with Chicago Seed
 Warren Leming: Aristophanes Blues

Rock music groups from Illinois
Musical groups from Chicago
Musical groups established in 1968
Musical groups disestablished in 1973
1973 establishments in Illinois